Journey is the third album by singer Colin Blunstone, former member of the British rock band The Zombies. It was released in 1974 (see 1974 in music).

Track listing
All tracks composed by Colin Blunstone; except where indicated
 "Wonderful" (Rod Argent, Chris White)
 "Beginning" 
 "Keep the Curtains Closed Today" 
 "Weak for You" (Pete Wingfield)
 "Beware" (Argent, White)
 "Smooth Operation" (Pete Wingfield)
 "This is Your Captain Calling" (Richard Kerr, Gary Osborne)
 "Something Happens When You Touch Me" (Blunstone, Richard Kerr)
 "Setting Yourself Up"
 "Brother Lover" (Blunstone, Richard Kerr)
 "Shadow of a Doubt" (Pete Wingfield)

Personnel
Colin Blunstone – vocals, acoustic guitar
Rod Argent – piano, keyboards and co-producer on "Beware"
Duncan Browne – classical guitar
Derek Griffiths – guitar, backing vocals
Richard Kerr – piano on "This is Your Captain Speaking"
Pete Wingfield – keyboards, backing vocals
Terry Poole – drums
Jim Toomey – drums
John Beecham – horn
Michael Cotton – horn
Nick Newall – horn
The King's Singers – chorus on tracks 1-3
Chris Gunning - chorus director
Pip Williams - orchestral arrangements 
Production notes:
Chris White - producer
Peter Vince – engineer
Mike Ross – engineer
Simon Cantwell, Mark Vigars - artwork

References

1974 albums
Colin Blunstone albums
Albums produced by Chris White (musician)
Epic Records albums